Sten Torgny Söderberg (26 November 1944 – 5 August 2022) was a Swedish songwriter. He was mainly known for working with Lena Philipsson and wrote schlager songs such as "100%", "Kärleken är evig" and "Diggi-loo diggi-ley". "Diggi-loo diggi-ley", written with lyricist Britt Lindeborg, won the Swedish heats of Melodifestivalen 1984 and later in the same year, won the Eurovision Song Contest 1984 for Sweden.

References

External links
 
 

1944 births
2022 deaths
Eurovision Song Contest winners
Swedish songwriters
People from Varberg